Arnele Avenue station is a San Diego Trolley station served by the Orange and Green Lines in the San Diego suburb of El Cajon, California. It serves as the eastern terminus of the Orange Line.

The station also has as a small park and ride that serves the surrounding residential community and also allows for access to a large commercial strip. Parkway Plaza, a major shopping mall, is within walking distance of the station.

History
However, the line's eastern terminus was once again extended on April 30, 2018, this time to Arnele Avenue.

Station layout
There are two tracks, each served by a side platform. Orange Line trains board and alight passengers from the eastbound platform, utilizing a switch south of the station to switch to the westbound track.

See also
 List of San Diego Trolley stations

References

Green Line (San Diego Trolley)
Orange Line (San Diego Trolley)
San Diego Trolley stations
Railway stations in the United States opened in 1995
1995 establishments in California